Marco Giovannetti (born 4 April 1962) is an Italian former professional road bicycle racer and Olympic gold medalist who won the Vuelta a España in 1990. He has also won stages at the Tour de Suisse and the Giro d'Italia.

Giovannetti was born in Milan, Italy to a Tuscan family. Early in his career as an amateur, Giovannetti won the gold medal in the Team Road Race at the 1984 Summer Olympics in Los Angeles, California, together with Claudio Vandelli, Marcello Bartalini and Eros Poli.

Giovannetti's overall win in the 1990 Vuelta a España was due to a decisive attack on stage 6 over the Las Palomas mountain range. Although he placed fifth on the stage, his competitors fared worse and Giovannetti moved into second place and by stage 11 he had moved into the lead and eventually defeating the defending champion Pedro Delgado, who finished in second place. He became only the fourth Italian to win the Spanish Grand Tour.

In 1991, Giovannetti finished all three Grand Tours in a single season.

Career achievements

Major results

1984 – Amateur
 Gold Medal, Summer Olympics Men's Team Road Race
1986
 Giro d'Italia:
 Winner Maglia bianca (youth classification)
8th place overall classification
1987 – GIS Gelati-Jollyscarpe
 4th overall and Stage 6 win, Tour de Suisse
 6th overall, Giro d'Italia
1988 – GIS Gelati-Bruiatori Ecoflam
 6th overall, Giro d'Italia
1989 – Seur
 8th overall, Giro d'Italia
 26th overall, Vuelta a España
1990 – Seur
 1st overall, Vuelta a España
 3rd overall, Giro d'Italia
1991 – Gatorade-Chateau d'Ax
 8th overall, Giro d'Italia
 30th overall, Tour de France
 18th overall, Vuelta a España
1992 – Gatorade-Chateau d'Ax
  Italian National Road Race Championship
 4th overall, Giro d'Italia
1993 – Mapei
 28th overall, Giro d'Italia

Grand Tour general classification results timeline

References

External links 

Official Tour de France results for Marco Giovannetti

1962 births
Living people
Italian male cyclists
Olympic cyclists of Italy
Cyclists at the 1984 Summer Olympics
Olympic gold medalists for Italy
Italian Giro d'Italia stage winners
Vuelta a España winners
Cyclists from Milan
Olympic medalists in cycling
Tour de Suisse stage winners
Medalists at the 1984 Summer Olympics